Yves Stéphane Bitséki Moto (born 23 April 1983) is Gabonese footballer who plays for Mosta FC in Maltese Premier League as a goalkeeper.

He was called to Gabon national football team at 2012 Africa Cup of Nations.

International career

International goals
Scores and results list Gabon's goal tally first.

References

External links
 
 

1983 births
Living people
Gabonese footballers
Gabon international footballers
Association football goalkeepers
Mosta F.C. players
Maltese Premier League players
2012 Africa Cup of Nations players
People from Woleu-Ntem Province
2015 Africa Cup of Nations players
2017 Africa Cup of Nations players
21st-century Gabonese people
Gabon A' international footballers
2011 African Nations Championship players
2016 African Nations Championship players